Love potion or poculum amatorium is a magical drink imagined to evoke feelings of love toward the person who served it.  

The love potion motif occurs in literature, mainly in fairy tales, and in paintings, music and mythologies. 

In practice in the Middle Ages, extracts from nightshades were used to make love potions; belladonna, angel's trumpets, jimsonweed, black henbane, European scopolia or autumn mandrake, which contain alkaloids (atropine and scopolamine, which are hallucinogenic in higher doses) characterized by a narrow therapeutic index. Some could lead to overdose or death due to the fact that the preparations were not standardized for the content of potent compounds.

Other alleged aphrodisiacs include Spanish fly, lizard necks, flowers, mashed worms, sacramental bread, and sweaty cakes (concocted of human hair, glandular excretions, skin and blood).

See also
Aphrodisiac
Cupid and Eros
Dating coach
Pickup artist

References

Seduction
Mythological food and drink
Hyoscyamus
Magic substances
Love